The following is a list of the 17 cantons of the Ardèche department, in France, following the French canton reorganisation which came into effect in March 2015:

 Annonay-1
 Annonay-2
 Aubenas-1
 Aubenas-2
 Berg-Helvie
 Bourg-Saint-Andéol
 Les Cévennes ardéchoises
 Guilherand-Granges
 Haute-Ardèche
 Haut-Eyrieux
 Haut-Vivarais
 Le Pouzin
 Privas
 Rhône-Eyrieux
 Sarras
 Tournon-sur-Rhône
 Vallon-Pont-d'Arc

References